The spectacled bulbul (Ixodia erythropthalmos), also known as the lesser brown bulbul, is a member of the bulbul family of passerine birds. It is found on the Malay Peninsula, Sumatra, and Borneo. The spectacled bulbul was originally described in the genus Ixos.

References

Ixodia (bird)
Birds of Brunei
Birds of Malesia
Birds described in 1878
Taxobox binomials not recognized by IUCN